Lake Ramsay  is a community in the Canadian province of Nova Scotia, located in the Chester Municipal District.  It is located to the north of a body of water also named Lake Ramsay.

References
 Lake Ramsay on Destination Nova Scotia

Communities in Lunenburg County, Nova Scotia
General Service Areas in Nova Scotia